Maria Christina of Austria (10 November 1574 – 6 April 1621), was a Princess of Transylvania by marriage to Sigismund Báthory, and for a period in 1598 elected sovereign Princess regnant of Transylvania.

Life
She was the daughter of Archduke Charles II of Austria, the son of Emperor Ferdinand I, and Maria Anna of Bavaria. Her elder brother Archduke Ferdinand, succeeded as Holy Roman Emperor in 1619.

Marriage
On 7 February 1595 was received in Graz the formal petition of marriage between Maria Christina and Sigismund Báthory, ruling Prince of Transylvania, by the nobleman Stephen Bocskay. The marriage contract was negotiated almost a month, and finally the bride on 15 June accompanied by her mother, the Prince-Bishop George of Lavant and 6000 German horsemen. In Kaschau Maria Christina fell ill with fever, which delayed the re-ride. The formal marriage took place in Weissenburg on 6 August 1595, and soon after Maria Christina moved to Transylvania.

Princess consort
The marriage was regarded as a major political gain, as Sigismund, formerly a vassal of the Ottoman Empire, now formed close ties with the Holy Roman Empire. Emperor Rudolf II appointed Sigismund Prince of the Holy Roman Empire (Reichsfürst), and also secured the possession of Transylvania, if the couple remain without offspring. The agreement was signed on 16 January 1595 by the Hungarian parliament in Bratislava.

However, this union proved to be completely unhappy: Sigismund, after a disastrous wedding night, refused to consummate the marriage and sent his wife to a fortress in Kővárgara, where Maria Christina was kept as prisoner.

Reign
In 18 April 1598, at the request of the local nobility, she was elected to occupy the Transylvanian throne after her husband abdicated. However, her rule was only nominal because Emperor Rudolf II sent representatives to rule. On 20 August 1598, Sigismund Báthory regained the throne and reconciled with his wife, but sent her again to Kővár.

Later life
When Sigismund abdicated for a second time in March 1599, Maria Christina finally left him and return to Austria in April. On 17 August 1599 Pope Clement VIII dissolved her marriage, and in 1607 she joined to her younger sister Eleanor in the Haller Convent (Haller Damenstift) in Hall in Tirol, where she died in 1621, aged forty-six.

Ancestors

References

1574 births
1621 deaths
16th-century House of Habsburg
17th-century House of Habsburg
Austrian princesses
Sigismund Bathory
16th-century Romanian people
16th-century women rulers
16th-century Romanian women
17th-century Romanian women
17th-century Romanian people
Daughters of monarchs